Depressaria olerella is a moth of the family Depressariidae. It is found in most of Europe, except Ireland, the Netherlands, the Iberian Peninsula and most of the Balkan Peninsula.

The wingspan is 20–23 mm. Adults are on wing from March to October.

The larvae feed on Achillea millefolium, Tanacetum vulgare, Tanacetum corymbosum and Senecio species. They live between leaves spun together with silk.

References

External links
lepiforum.de

Moths described in 1854
Depressaria
Moths of Europe
Taxa named by Philipp Christoph Zeller